Slime Language is the debut collaborative compilation album by American record label YSL Records and American rapper Young Thug, who is the leader of the label. It was released on August 17, 2018 for streaming and digital download by YSL Records and 300 Entertainment. The compilation features guest appearances from YSL artists Lil Duke, Gunna, Strick, Thug's sisters Dolly and HiDoraah, Thug's fiance (Jerrika) Karlae, as well as Lil Uzi Vert, Lil Keed, Nechie, Lil Baby, Jacquees, Tracy T and others. The album is executive produced by Wheezy and London on da Track and features production from Keyyz, K Bangerz, Kacey Khaliel, DY, Charlie Handsome, Smoke, Mattazik, Super, Billboard Hitmakers and Turbo, among others. The album's sequel, Slime Language 2, was released on April 16, 2021, with the deluxe edition of the album being released exactly a week later on April 23, 2021.

Background
On August 1, 2018, the album was announced by Young Thug, when he sent several music publications pet snakes and a booklet containing names of artists including Lil Uzi Vert, Gunna and Jacquees. Thug initially set the release date for his 27th birthday, August 16, but later clarified that it would be released later in the evening on August 16. A representative for Thug explained that the album was a "compilation project [and] not a Young Thug album, EP or mixtape."

Critical reception

At Metacritic, which assigns a normalized rating out of 100 to reviews from mainstream publications, the album received an average score of 68, based on 6 reviews, indicating "generally favourable reviews". Charles Holmes of XXL concluded: "Endearing, ambitious and a tad overstuffed, Slime Language is a literal and figurative family reunion. However, like any Black family reunion, the project captivates when the young are allowed to flex in front of the father and claw their way from the periphery to the main stage." Riley Wallace from Exclaim! applauded the album, saying, "Thug is a rock star who knows his audience, and Slime Language shows his ear for talent on full display", adding that the album "walks the fine line of consistency and monotony, delivering a stream of well-crafted bangers sprinkled with Thugga's unmistakable aura as the binding glue." HotNewHipHop believed that "Thug sounds like he's having the most fun he's had since his Rich Gang days." Despite being a compilation, Evan Rytlewski of Pitchfork believed Slime Language "is so generous with its star attraction that the distinction barely matters, and Thug digs in with his usual rubber-jawed zeal", also stating that the project is Young Thug's "most cheerful, undemanding project since the I Came from Nothing mixtapes of his less adventurous early years, before stylistic gambits took hold over simple pleasures."

Online hip hop publication HipHopDX stated that Slime Language "suffers from being predictable, which is the last thing you’d ever want or expect from a Young Thug-affiliated project. The lesser-known artists don't make much of a mark, the more notorious features are the clear highlights, and the project, as a whole, offers nothing to compete with the highs of Beautiful Thugger Girls — let alone the hallucinatory string of releases from 2015." Thomas Hobbs of Highsnobiety believed the album was underwhelming as a compilation project, though fared well as a solo project: "If you need reminding of why Young Thug is one of modern rap’s most original stars, Slime Language provides plenty of evidence. However, as a showcase for Young Stoner Life Records, it feels like it’s lacking. Young Thug clearly has aspirations to follow his inspiration Lil Wayne and help launch the careers of future superstars, but this record doesn’t feel like the moment he will achieve this dream. Put simply; Slime Language is a good Young Thug album, but an average compilation project. Don’t be surprised if you find yourself fast-forwarding straight to the Thugger verses."

Commercial performance
Slime Language debuted at number eight on the US Billboard 200 with 41,000 album-equivalent units, with streaming units accounting for 38,000 of the total.

Track listing
Credits adapted from Geoffrey Ogunlesi's Instagram and in part from BMI and ASCAP.

Personnel
Credits adapted from Geoffrey Ogunlesi's Instagram.

 Bainz – recording 
 Chef – recording 
 Alex Tumay – recording , mixing 
 Shaan Singh – recording 
 Jenso Plymouth – recording 
 Turn Me Up Josh – recording , additional mixing                  
 Joe LaPorta – mastering

Charts

References

2018 debut albums
Young Thug albums
Albums produced by London on da Track
YSL Records albums
Record label compilation albums